Vi gå över daggstänkta berg ("We walk over dew-sprinkled mountains") is a Swedish folk song, whose lyrics was written by Olof Thunman. The melody is of disputed origin, but is attributed to Edwin Ericsson.

Background

Olof Thunman was an enthusiastic hiker and well known in the areas around Uppsala where he hiked in his steel-shod ski boots, suit and overcoat. He was inspired by the philosopher Jean-Jacques Rousseau for whom walking was a necessity of life and not a question of movement. He wrote the hiking song "We go over dew-sprinkled mountains" in 1900 when he was 21 years old. Different versions of the origin of the song exist, but according to Ellenius, it was created after a happy evening at the railway hotel in Flen. Thunman was serving as tutor to the sons of bank director Henning Ericsson in Flen, and he had spent a summer evening in 1900 at the hotel restaurant with the oldest son Edwin and station writer Hjalmar Hökberg, which ended with a walk on a road towards Stenhammar's castle. Edwin Ericsson played accordion and Thunman improvised the first lines of "We go over dew-fresh mountain" (which was later changed to "dew-sprinkled").

The origins of the melody are also disputed as some believe that it is a folk song from Hälsingland, while Thunman himself said that he received the melody from his grandmother and thus believed that it was from Gästrikland. Edwin Ericsson, on the other hand, claims that it was he who composed the melody.  Herman Sör Carlsson wrote in an article in Upsala Nya Tidning in 1990 that the chorus "fallera" is a later addition and that in the original text the final words are repeated in the verse as: Vi gå över daggstänkta berg, berg, berg.

The text was published in 1906 in the Christmas edition of the magazine Strix, with text and music by Abraham Lundquist's publishing house 1908, and in the collection "Den svenska frihetsvisan och andra sånger vid hembygdsmöten" ("The Swedish freedom song and other songs for homeland associations" published by the Norrland students' educational association in Uppsala (1908), later also by the Woman's Christian Temperance Union in Vita bandets sångbok (1915) and in Nu ska vi sjunga (1943). It was one of the main songs that were compulsory in Swedish school education in 1943–1969.

Lyrics
In the final version of the song, the lyrics are as follows:

Vi gå över daggstänkta berg
som lånat av smaragderna sin färg.
Sorger ha vi inga,
våra glada visor klinga
när vi gå över daggstänkta berg.

I mänskor, förglömmen er gråt,
och kommen och följen oss åt.
Se, fjärran vi gånga
att solskenet fånga
ja kommen och följen oss åt.

De gamla och kloka må le,
vi äro ej förståndiga som de.
Men vem skulle sjunga 
om våren den unga,
om vi vore kloka som de?

Så gladeligt hand uti hand,
nu gå vi till fågel Fenix land.
Till ett sagoland som skiner
av kristaller och rubiner,
nu gå vi till fågel Fenix land.

English version
This translation strives to retain the rhyming structure of the words, the coherence with the melody, while keeping a relatively similar meaning of the lyrics as the Swedish original, as well as the intention of giving a feeling of happiness and being in the present:

We’re strolling on dew-sprinkled hills, la la la
Whose beauty our hearts with joy instills, la la la
We’re blissful as we’re singing,
our merry songs are ringing,
As we’re strolling on dew-sprinkled hills, la la la

O people, forget your all your tears, la la la
And come with us and join in our cheers, la la la
Our path so distant reaches,
to blue lakes and sunny beaches,
Ah, come with us and join in our cheers, la la la

The old and wise they may smile, la la la
We are as calm just once in a while, la la la
But who would then be singing,
‘bout the brighter days now springing,
‘less we are allowed to be juvenile, la la la

So happily hand in hand, la la la
We’re going to the Phoenix’ land, la la la
The faeryland that shines
of crystals and grapevines
As we’re going to the Phoenix’ land, la la la

Other languages
The melody is also used for a text for a children's show in Hebrew titled "Our big green car", written by the poet Fania Bergstein in the 1940s. Bergstein was a member of the Zionist youth movement He-Halutz Hatzair.

In German, the song was also used by the Wandervogel movement with the text "Im Frühtau zu Berge". The first text version in German is a translation of unknown author and was published in 1917. In 1924 a new version of the song was published by Walther Hensel. From the middle of the 1920s the song appeared in many German song books, including in a song book for the Hitler Youth.

Recordings
An early recording was made by Oscar Bergström in October 1908, published by the record company Scandinavian gramophone in Stockholm entitled Gångsång ("Walking Song").

The song has also been recorded in English, by Alice Babs and Svend Asmussen on the album Scandinavian Songs of Alice Babs & Svend Asmussen 1964, titled "Through Valleys, Up Mountains".

A more recent but still simple recording is available, with both song and guitar play by Christer Lindén.

References

External links
Performance by Christer Lindén

Swedish folk songs